This is a list of websites about food and drink.

Websites about food and drink

 African Food Network
 ChefsFeed
 The Daily Meal
 Eater.com
 Food Network
 Food.com
 Freezerburns
 Gil's Thrilling (And Filling) Blog
 HungryGoWhere
 Just A Pinch Recipes
 LocalEats
 The Packer
 Pimp That Snack
 OpenRice
 Serious Eats
 Smitten Kitchen
 Sprudge
 Tasting Table
 This is why you're fat
 Urbanspoon
 Yummly
 Cucumbertown
 Epicurious
 FoodPair
 Meishichina
 My Drunk Kitchen
 MSN Food & Drink
 NeverSeconds
 PlateCulture
 RecipeBridge
 Simply Recipes

Online food ordering

 Bolt
 DASHED
 DoorDash
 Deliveroo
 Delivery Hero
 Delivery.com
 EasyPizza
 EatStreet
 Foodhub
 Foodler
 Foodpanda / hellofood
 Glovo
 Grab
 GrubHub
 Hungryhouse
 Just Eat
 Menulog
 OpenRest
 Seamless
 Swiggy
 Takeaway.com
 Too Good To Go
 Ubereats
 Waiter.com
 Yemeksepeti
 Zomato

Wine websites

  American Winery Guide
  Bottlenotes
  Bourgogne Live
  Snooth
  Vinopedia.hr
  Vivino
  Wine Folly

See also

 List of books about food and drink
 List of films about cooking
 List of films about food and drink
 List of food and drink magazines
 Lists of websites

References

 
Websites about food and drink
Food and drink